World of Warcraft: Tides of Darkness is a fantasy novel written by Aaron S. Rosenberg and published by Simon & Schuster Pocket Star Books, a division of Viacom. The novel is based on Blizzard Entertainment's Warcraft universe, and is a novelization of the RTS PC game: Warcraft II: Tides of Darkness (1995). It was made available on August 28, 2007 .

Plot
The novel explores the events of the Second War (which took place during Warcraft II) when the Orcish Horde, led by Warchief Orgrim Doomhammer, returns to Azeroth to destroy the Human nations. The book writer Aaron S. Rosenberg commented at a public Q&A that among the main characters are Khadgar, Turalyon, Lothar, the sisters Windrunner (Alleria, Sylvanas and Vereesa), Orgrim Doomhammer, Zul'jin and Gul'dan.

Places featured are Hillsbrad, Stromgarde, Blackrock Spire, Caer Darrow, Stratholme and Quel'Thalas among others.

Association
Warcraft II: Tides of Darkness is the sequel to the popular real-time strategy game Warcraft: Orcs & Humans, developed by Blizzard Entertainment and released in December 1995.

See also
Warcraft II: Beyond the Dark Portal
Warcraft: Orcs & Humans
Warcraft III: Reign of Chaos
World of Warcraft
 List of novels based on video games

External links

2007 American novels
Tides of Darkness